Carrie Brown (1834 – April 24, 1891) was a New York City prostitute who was murdered and mutilated in a lodging house. She is occasionally mentioned as an alleged victim of Jack the Ripper. Although known to use numerous aliases, a common practice in her occupation, she supposedly won her nickname of Shakespeare for her habit of quoting William Shakespeare during drinking games. She has often been referred to as Old Shakespeare in later news articles and books and contemporaneous newspapers.

Murder

The badly mutilated body of Brown, a longtime Bowery prostitute, was found in a room in a squalid lodging house known as the East River Hotel on April 24, 1891. Newspapers were quick to report the murder as proof of the alleged arrival in America of Jack the Ripper, whose murders of prostitutes in London's Whitechapel district were well known during the time. News of the possibility that Jack the Ripper had arrived in New York City posed a challenge to NYPD Chief Inspector Thomas Byrnes, who had criticized Scotland Yard for its inability to capture Jack the Ripper.

As the murder of Brown was soon becoming one of the most publicized in the city's history, pressure was on Byrnes to solve the murder as quickly as possible, and an Algerian named Ameer Ben Ali (who also went by "Frenchy" or "Frenchy No. 1") was arrested for the murder soon after. However, evidence against Ben Ali was largely circumstantial and based primarily on the claim that unidentified bloodstains had been found leading from the room where Brown was killed into the room he was staying in. Reporters who had been at the scene of the crime said that no such bloodstains were actually there. Due to testimony from doctors who made claims that could not be supported by medical tests at the time, Ben Ali was tried and convicted of second degree murder and sentenced to life imprisonment, despite his claims of innocence.

However, a group of reformers pointed out instances of police misconduct in the investigation and evidence to support Ben Ali's innocence. The group was able to prove the NYPD had made no attempt to find the missing key to the locked room or the unidentified man who witnesses claimed she had last been seen with the night before.

Years later it was claimed that a man in a New Jersey farm had found the missing key to Room 31 and a bloody shirt in a bureau drawer of a room he had rented out to a man who had disappeared shortly after the murder. Faced with this testimony, coupled with the longstanding belief of many for years that Ben Ali had been set up and the fact that Byrnes had been removed from office for corruption, Ben Ali was released after serving 11 years and left for his native Algeria shortly afterwards.

No substantial evidence has proven that Jack the Ripper was responsible and the case remains unsolved. It has been stated by writer Philip Sugden that if the murder was committed by Jack the Ripper, one possible culprit could be George Chapman, a Ripper suspect who moved from London to the US around this time, although recent research suggests that he only moved to the US after this murder. Another possibility suggested by writer James Tully is James Kelly, a Ripper suspect who murdered his wife by slashing her throat and was committed to Broadmoor Insane Asylum, which he escaped from just prior to the Ripper murders. He may have traveled to New York after the Ripper murders in London stopped.

In popular culture
The death of Brown and the murder's supposed ties to Jack the Ripper were used in writer Heather Graham's Sacred Evil.

References

Asbury, Herbert. The Gangs of New York. New York: Alfred A. Knopf, 1927. 
Sifakis, Carl. The Encyclopedia of American Crime. New York: Facts on File Inc., 2005. 
Conway, J. North. The Big Policeman. Lyons Press, Guilford, Connecticut, 2010. 
Dekle, George R.  The East River Ripper : The Mysterious 1891 Murder of Old Shakespeare. Kent State University Press, 2021. ISBN 978-1-60635-426-1

1834 births
1891 deaths
American murder victims
People from New York City
People murdered in New York City
American prostitutes
Jack the Ripper
Sex workers murdered in the United States
 1891 murders in the United States
History of women in New York City
Women in New York City
19th-century American women
1891 in New York City